Albert Imre Szent-Györgyi de Nagyrápolt (September 16, 1893 – October 22, 1986) was a Hungarian biochemist who won the Nobel Prize in Physiology or Medicine in 1937. He is credited with first isolating vitamin C and discovering the components and reactions of the citric acid cycle. He was also active in the Hungarian Resistance during World War II, and entered Hungarian politics after the war.

Early life
Szent-Györgyi was born in Budapest, Kingdom of Hungary in 1893. His father, Miklós Szent-Györgyi, was a landowner, born in Marosvásárhely, Transylvania (today Târgu Mureş, Romania), a Calvinist, and could trace his ancestry back to 1608 when Sámuel, a Calvinist predicant, was ennobled. At the time of Szent-Györgyi's birth, being of the nobility was considered important and created opportunities that otherwise were not available. (Miklós Szent-Györgyi's parents were Imre Szent-Györgyi and Mária Csiky). His mother, Jozefina, a Roman Catholic, was a daughter of József Lenhossék and Anna Bossányi.  Jozefina was a sister of Mihály Lenhossék; both of these men were Professors of Anatomy at the Eötvös Loránd University. His family included three generations of scientists. Music was important in the Lenhossék family. His mother Jozefina prepared to become an opera singer and auditioned for Gustav Mahler, then a conductor at the Budapest Opera. He advised her to marry instead, since her voice was not enough. Albert himself was good at the piano, while his brother Pál became a professional violinist.

Education

Szent-Györgyi began his studies at the Semmelweis University in 1911, and then began research in his uncle's anatomy lab. His studies were interrupted in 1914 to serve as an army medic in World War I. In 1916, disgusted with the war, Szent-Györgyi shot himself in the arm, claimed to be wounded from enemy fire, and was sent home on medical leave. He was then able to finish his medical education and received his MD in 1917. He married Kornélia Demény, the daughter of the Hungarian Postmaster General, that same year.

After the war, Szent-Györgyi began his research career in Pozsony (today Bratislava, Slovakia). He switched universities several times over the next few years, finally ending up at the University of Groningen, where his work focused on the chemistry of cellular respiration. This work landed him a position as a Rockefeller Foundation fellow at the University of Cambridge. He received his PhD from the University of Cambridge in 1929 where he was a student at Fitzwilliam College, Cambridge. His research involved isolating an organic acid, which he then called "hexuronic acid", from adrenal gland tissue.

Career and research
Szent-Györgyi accepted a position at the University of Szeged in Hungary in 1930. There Szent-Györgyi and his research fellow Joseph Svirbely found that "hexuronic acid" was actually the thus far unidentified antiscorbutic factor, known as vitamin C. After Walter Norman Haworth had determined the structure of vitamin C, and in honour of its antiscorbutic properties, it was given the formal chemical name of L-ascorbic acid. In some experiments they used paprika as the source for their vitamin C. Also during this time, Szent-Györgyi continued his work on cellular respiration, identifying fumaric acid and other steps in what would become known as the Krebs cycle. In Szeged he also met Zoltán Bay, physicist, who became his personal friend and partner in research on matters of bio-physics.

In 1937 he received the Nobel Prize in Physiology or Medicine "for his discoveries in connection with the biological combustion process with special reference to vitamin C and the catalysis of fumaric acid". Albert Szent-Györgyi offered all of his Nobel prize money to Finland in 1940. (Hungarian Volunteers in the Winter War travelled to fight for the Finns after the Soviet invasion of Finland in 1939.)

In 1938 he began work on the biophysics of muscle movement. He found that muscles contain actin, which when combined with the protein myosin and the energy source ATP, contract muscle fibers. In 1946, Albert received the Cameron Prize for Therapeutics of the University of Edinburgh.

In 1947 Szent-Györgyi established the Institute for Muscle Research at the Marine Biological Laboratory in Woods Hole, Massachusetts with financial support from Hungarian businessman Stephen Rath. However,  Szent-Györgyi still faced funding difficulties for several years, due to his foreign status and former association with the government of a Communist nation. In 1948, he received a research position with the National Institutes of Health (NIH) in Bethesda, Maryland and began dividing his time between there and Woods Hole. In 1950, grants from the Armour Meat Company and the American Heart Association allowed him to establish the Institute for Muscle Research at Woods Hole. Szent-Györgyi conducted research at the MBL from 1947 to 1986 year-round. There, he found that whole muscle tissue retained its contractility almost indefinitely if stored cold in a fifty percent glycerol solution, thus eliminating the need to have fresh muscle on hand.

During the 1950s Szent-Györgyi began using electron microscopes to study muscles at the subunit level. He received the Lasker Award in 1954.  In 1955, he became a naturalized citizen of the United States. He was elected a Member of the National Academy of Sciences (NAS) in 1956.

In the late 1950s, Szent-Györgyi developed a research interest in cancer and developed ideas on applying the theories of quantum mechanics to the biochemistry (quantum biology) of cancer. The death of Rath, who had acted as the financial administrator of the Institute for Muscle Research, left Szent-Györgyi in a financial mess. Szent-Györgyi refused to submit government grants which required him to provide minute details on exactly how he intended to spend the research dollars and what he expected to find. After Szent-Györgyi commented on his financial hardships in a 1971 newspaper interview, attorney Franklin Salisbury contacted him and later helped him establish a private nonprofit organization, the National Foundation for Cancer Research. Late in life, Szent-Györgyi began to pursue free radicals as a potential cause of cancer. He came to see cancer as being ultimately an electronic problem at the molecular level.   In 1974, reflecting his interests in quantum physics, he proposed the term "syntropy" replace the term "negentropy". Ralph Moss, a protégé of his in the years he performed his cancer research, wrote a biography entitled Free Radical: Albert Szent-Gyorgyi and the Battle over Vitamin C. Aspects of this work are an important precursor to what is now dubbed redox signaling.

Statement on scientific discovery

Albert Szent-Györgyi, who realized that "a discovery must be, by definition, at variance with existing knowledge," divided scientists into two categories: the Apollonians and the Dionysians. He called scientific dissenters, who explored "the fringes of knowledge," Dionysians. He wrote, "In science the Apollonian tends to develop established lines to perfection, while the Dionysian rather relies on intuition and is more likely to open new, unexpected alleys for research...The future of mankind depends on the progress of science, and the progress of science depends on the support it can find. Support mostly takes the form of grants, and the present methods of distributing grants unduly favor the Apollonian."

Involvement in politics

As the government of Gyula Gömbös and the associated Hungarian National Defence Association gained control of politics in Hungary, Szent-Györgyi helped his Jewish friends escape from the country. During World War II, he joined the Hungarian resistance movement. Although Hungary was allied with the Axis Powers, the Hungarian prime minister Miklós Kállay sent Szent-Györgyi to Istanbul in 1944 under the guise of a scientific lecture to begin secret negotiations with the Allies. The Germans learned of this plot and Adolf Hitler himself issued a warrant for the arrest of Szent-Györgyi. He escaped from house arrest and spent 1944 to 1945 as a fugitive from the Gestapo.

After the war, Szent-Györgyi had become well-recognized as a public figure and there was some speculation that he might become President of Hungary, should the Soviets permit it. Szent-Györgyi established a laboratory at the University of Budapest and became head of the biochemistry department there. He was elected a member of Parliament and helped re-establish the Academy of Sciences. Dissatisfied with the Communist rule of Hungary, he emigrated to the United States in 1947.

In 1967, Szent-Györgyi signed a letter declaring his intention to refuse to pay taxes as a means of protesting against the U.S. war against Vietnam, and urging other people to take a similar stand.

Works online
 "Teaching and the Expanding Knowledge", in Rampart Journal of Individualist Thought, Vol. 1, No. 1 (March 1965). 24–28. (Reprinted from Science, Vol. 146, No. 3649 [December 4, 1964]. 1278–1279.)

Publications
 On Oxidation, Fermentation, Vitamins, Health, and Disease (1940)
 Bioenergetics (1957)
 Introduction to a Submolecular Biology (1960)
 The Crazy Ape (1970) 
 What next?! (1971) 
 Electronic Biology and Cancer: A New Theory of Cancer (1976)
 The living state (1972)
 Bioelectronics: a study in cellular regulations, defense and cancer
 Lost in the Twentieth Century  (Gandu) (1963)

Personal life

He married Cornelia Demény (1898-1981), daughter of the Hungarian Postmaster-General, in 1917. Their daughter, Cornelia Szent-Györgyi, was born in 1918 and died in 1969.  He and Cornelia divorced in 1941.

In 1941, he wed Marta Borbiro Miskolczy. She died of cancer in 1963.

Szent-Györgyi married June Susan Wichterman, the 25-year-old daughter of Woods Hole biologist Ralph Wichterman, in 1965. They were divorced in 1968.

He married his fourth wife, Marcia Houston, in 1975. They adopted a daughter, Lola von Szent-Györgyi.

Death and legacy
Szent-Györgyi died in Woods Hole, Massachusetts, US, on October 22, 1986. He was honored with a Google Doodle September 16, 2011, 118 years after his birth. In 2004, nine interviews were conducted with family, colleagues, and others to create a Szent-Györgyi oral history collection.

Notes

References

Bibliography

US National Library of Medicine. The Albert Szent-Györgyi Papers.NIH Profiles in Science
 

 Ilona Újszászi (ed.): The intellectual heritage of Albert Szent-Györgyi = Szegedi Egyetemi Tudástár 2.(Series editors.: László Dux, István Hannus, József Pál, Ilona Újszászi) Publishing Department-University of Szeged. 2014. 
 László Dux: On the Basics of Biochemistry. In: The intellectual heritage of Albert Szent-Györgyi = Szegedi Egyetemi Tudástár 2.(Series editors.: László Dux, István Hannus, József Pál, Ilona Újszászi) Publishing Department-University of Szeged. 2014. 13–23. 
 János Wölfling: Life through the eyes of a chemist. In: The intellectual heritage of Albert Szent-Györgyi = Szegedi Egyetemi Tudástár 2.(Series editors.: László Dux, István Hannus, József Pál, Ilona Újszászi) Publishing Department-University of Szeged. 2014. 24–34. 
 Gábor Tóth: From vitamins to peptides - Research topics in Szent-Györgyi's departments. In: The intellectual heritage of Albert Szent-Györgyi = Szegedi Egyetemi Tudástár 2.(Series editors.: László Dux, István Hannus, József Pál, Ilona Újszászi) Publishing Department-University of Szeged. 2014. 35–57. 
 István Hannus: The Analysis of Vitamin C in Szeged. In: The intellectual heritage of Albert Szent-Györgyi = Szegedi Egyetemi Tudástár 2.(Series editors.: László Dux, István Hannus, József Pál, Ilona Újszászi) Publishing Department-University of Szeged. 2014. 58–76.  
 Mária Homoki-Nagy: Protection of the creations of the mind in the history of Hungarian law. Copyright and patent rights; primacy and ethics in science. In: The intellectual heritage of Albert Szent-Györgyi = Szegedi Egyetemi Tudástár 2.(Series editors.: László Dux, István Hannus, József Pál, Ilona Újszászi) Publishing Department-University of Szeged. 2014. 77–93.  
 Miklós Gábor: Albert Szent-Györgyi's Studies on Flavones. Impact of the Discovery. In: The intellectual heritage of Albert Szent-Györgyi = Szegedi Egyetemi Tudástár 2.(Series editors.: László Dux, István Hannus, József Pál, Ilona Újszászi) Publishing Department-University of Szeged. 2014. 94-122.  
 Tamás Vajda: Effects of the discovery of vitamin C on the paprika industry and the economy of the southern part of the Hungarian Great Plain. In: The intellectual heritage of Albert Szent-Györgyi = Szegedi Egyetemi Tudástár 2.(Series editors.: László Dux, István Hannus, József Pál, Ilona Újszászi) Publishing Department-University of Szeged. 2014. 123–152. 
 Béla Pukánszky: The thoughts of Albert Szent-Györgyi on pedagogy. In: The intellectual heritage of Albert Szent-Györgyi = Szegedi Egyetemi Tudástár 2.(Series editors.: László Dux, István Hannus, József Pál, Ilona Újszászi) Publishing Department-University of Szeged. 2014. 153–169.  
 Csaba Jancsák: Albert Szent-Györgyi and the Student Union of the University of Szeged. In: The intellectual heritage of Albert Szent-Györgyi = Szegedi Egyetemi Tudástár 2.(Series editors.: László Dux, István Hannus, József Pál, Ilona Újszászi) Publishing Department-University of Szeged. 2014. 170–193. 
 József Pál: From the Unity of Life to the Coequality of the Forms of Consciousness. Worries of Albert Szent-Györgyi in Times of War. In: The intellectual heritage of Albert Szent-Györgyi = Szegedi Egyetemi Tudástár 2.(Series editors.: László Dux, István Hannus, József Pál, Ilona Újszászi) Publishing Department-University of Szeged. 2014. 194–210.  http://publicatio.bibl.u-szeged.hu/6615/1/Sz_Gy-Unity_of_life.pdf
 Ildikó Tasiné Csúcs: The science-rescuing activity of Albert Szent-Györgyi and its roots in Hungary after   1945. In: The intellectual heritage of Albert Szent-Györgyi = Szegedi Egyetemi Tudástár 2.(Series editors.: László Dux, István Hannus, József Pál, Ilona Újszászi) Publishing Department-University of Szeged. 2014. 211–227.  http://publicatio.bibl.u-szeged.hu/5744/1/Science_rescuing.pdf
 József Pál: About Albert Szent-Györgyi's Poems. In: The intellectual heritage of Albert Szent-Györgyi = Szegedi Egyetemi Tudástár 2.(Series editors.: László Dux, István Hannus, József Pál, Ilona Újszászi) Publishing Department-University of Szeged. 2014. 228–237.  https://web.archive.org/web/20160506215625/http://publicatio.bibl.u-szeged.hu/6611/1/A_Sz-Gy_poems.pdf
 Gábor Szabó: The passage of Szent-Györgyi to biophysics: a journey from the blur of the boundaries of disciplines through the instruments used for research with a stopover at the paprika centrifuge and arriving at the super lasers. In: The intellectual heritage of Albert Szent-Györgyi = Szegedi Egyetemi Tudástár 2.(Series editors.: László Dux, István Hannus, József Pál, Ilona Újszászi) Publishing Department-University of Szeged. 2014. 238–253.

External links 

 
 
 
 

1893 births
1986 deaths
Alumni of Fitzwilliam College, Cambridge
American anti-war activists
American tax resisters
Cancer researchers
Citric acid cycle
Honorary Fellows of the Royal Society of Edinburgh
Hungarian biochemists
Hungarian emigrants to the United States
Hungarian Nobel laureates
Austro-Hungarian Nobel laureates
Hungarian people of World War II
Institute for Advanced Study visiting scholars
Members of the National Assembly of Hungary (1945–1947)
Members of the United States National Academy of Sciences
Nobel laureates in Physiology or Medicine
Hungarian physiologists
Recipients of the Albert Lasker Award for Basic Medical Research
Semmelweis University alumni
Academic staff of the University of Szeged
Vitamin C
Vitamin researchers